Foard County is a county located in the U.S. state of Texas. As of the 2020 census, its population was 1,095. Its county seat is Crowell, which is also the county's only incorporated community. The county is named for Robert Levi Foard, an attorney who served as a major with the Confederate Army, in the American Civil War.

Foard County was one of 46 prohibition, or entirely dry, counties in the state of Texas until voters approved a referendum to permit the legal sale of alcoholic beverages in May 2006.

Geography

Major highways
  U.S. Highway 70
  State Highway 6

Adjacent counties
 Hardeman County (north)
 Wilbarger County (east)
 Baylor County (southeast)
 Knox County (south)
 King County (southwest)
 Cottle County (west)

Demographics

Note: the US Census treats Hispanic/Latino as an ethnic category. This table excludes Latinos from the racial categories and assigns them to a separate category. Hispanics/Latinos can be of any race.

As of the census of 2000,  1,622 people, 664 households, and 438 families resided in the county.  The population density was two people per square mile (1/km2).  The 850 housing units averaged one per square mile.  The racial makeup of the county was 84.16% White, 3.27% Black or African American, 0.62% Native American, 0.18% Asian, 10.23% from other races, and 1.54% from two or more races. About 16.34% of the population was Hispanic or Latino of any race. 

Of the 664 households, 29.10% had children under the age of 18 living with them, 54.10% were married couples living together, 9.50% had a female householder with no husband present, and 34.00% were not families; 31.80% of all households were made up of individuals, and 19.30% had someone living alone who was 65 years of age or older.  The average household size was 2.38, and the average family size was 3.02. As of the 2010 census, about seven same-sex couples per 1,000 households were in the county.

In the county, the population was distributed as  25.80% under the age of 18, 5.80% from 18 to 24, 22.30% from 25 to 44, 22.90% from 45 to 64, and 23.10% who were 65 years of age or older.  The median age was 42 years. For every 100 females, there were 86.40 males.  For every 100 females age 18 and over, there were 85.10 males.

The median income for a household in the county was $25,813, and for a family was $34,211. Males had a median income of $21,852 versus $16,450 for females. The per capita income for the county was $14,799.  About 9.90% of families and 14.30% of the population were below the poverty line, including 14.50% of those under age 18 and 16.20% of those age 65 or over.

Politics
Foard County is represented in the Texas House of Representatives by the Republican James Frank, a businessman from Wichita Falls.
Foard County was once a stronghold for the Democratic Party at both the state and federal levels, both by Solid South standards and as the rest of North Texas and the rural parts of the state trended towards the Republican Party. The county last voted for a Democratic presidential candidate when it gave its votes to Bill Clinton in 1996. Since 1996, the vote share of Republican presidential candidates has steadily increased in every election, jumping to a record high of nearly 81% for Donald Trump in 2020.

At the statewide level, most notably in recent gubernatorial races, the county was one of the few rural ones that continued to give its votes to Democratic candidates in this area, even as it trended Republican on the national level. For instance, in the landslide re-election of then-governor George W. Bush in 1998, it was one of only 14 counties that gave its votes to Bush's Democratic challenger Garry Mauro, albeit by one vote, as Mauro won 206 votes (49.6%) to Bush's 205 votes (49.4%). The county continued this trend through all of Rick Perry's three gubernatorial landslide elections in 2002, 2006, and 2010, the most recent one when it gave its votes to Bill White. This streak ended in 2014, when the county gave its votes to then-Attorney General Greg Abbott, who won 66% of the popular vote over Wendy Davis's 33%.

Attractions
 Copper Breaks State Park  is located near the Pease River about 8 miles north of Crowell off State Highway 6. The park is located in neighboring Hardeman County.
 Comanche Springs Astronomy Campus is located 10 miles west of Crowell off U.S. Highway 70. It is operated by the 3 Rivers Foundation for the Arts & Sciences, which is based in Crowell.

Communities
 Crowell (county seat)
 Thalia

Education
School districts serving sections of the county include:
 Crowell Independent School District
 Vernon Independent School District

The county is in the service area of Vernon College.

See also

 Recorded Texas Historic Landmarks in Foard County

References

External links
 
 Foard County Profile from the Texas Association of Counties 

 
1891 establishments in Texas
Populated places established in 1891